Hans Møller Kristensen (born April 7, 1961) is director of the Nuclear Information Project at the Federation of American Scientists.  He writes about nuclear weapons policy there; he is coauthor of the Nuclear Notebook column in the Bulletin of the Atomic Scientists, and the World Nuclear Forces appendix in Stockholm International Peace Research Institute's annual SIPRI Yearbook.

His work especially relies on using the Freedom of Information Act to compel US government agencies to release documents. He maintains an on-line overview of the number of nuclear weapons in the world, and writes frequently on the FAS Strategic Security Blog.

He is critical of the development and deployment of nuclear weaponry by the United States, the United Kingdom, and France.  In 2005 he discovered a draft document on a Pentagon website that proposed a change in U.S. nuclear doctrine to include the possibility of a preemptive nuclear strike.  Even though Secretary Rumsfeld had not approved the change, its publication provoked a reaction from some members of Congress.  In 2022, US President Joe Biden announced that the United States would use nuclear weapons as a first strike in "extreme circumstance," without any objection from Kristensen or the Federation of American Scientists.

Professional history

References

External links

List of Publications (FAS index)
Bulletin of the Atomic Scientists  (BAS index)
Hans M. Kristensen in the news (FAS overview)

Danish expatriates in the United States
American anti–nuclear weapons activists
1961 births
Living people
American political writers
American male non-fiction writers
People associated with Greenpeace